Dai Yun (born 22 November 1977)  is a Chinese former badminton player.

Career 
At the beginning of the century Dai was ranked among the world's leading women's singles players, most of whom were her fellow countrywomen. Her titles included the Chinese Taipei (1999), Malaysia (1999), Thailand (1999, 2003), and Swiss (2000) Opens. She was a highly effective member of consecutive world champion Chinese Uber Cup (women's international) teams in 1998, 2000, 2002. However, in badminton's three most prestigious competitions for individual players – the All-England Championships, the World Championships, and the Olympic Games – victory eluded Dai. She was a runner-up to Chinese teammates at the 1999 and 2000 All-Englands. At the 1999 World Championships in Copenhagen she reached the final only to lose the closest of matches to Denmark's Camilla Martin. At the 2000 Olympics in Sydney she was beaten by Martin, again, in the semifinals, and then lost a close bronze medal match to fellow countrywoman Ye Zhaoying. Dai's results slipped somewhat after 2000, and she retired from international play in 2004.

She is married to another former Chinese badminton player, Liu Yong.

Achievements

World Championships 
Women's singles

Asian Championships
Women's singles

IBF World Grand Prix 
Women's singles

Record against selected opponents 
Record against year-end Finals finalists, World Championships semi-finalists, and Olympic quarter-finalists.

References

External links 
 
 

1977 births
Living people
Sportspeople from Nanjing
Badminton players from Jiangsu
Chinese female badminton players
Badminton players at the 2000 Summer Olympics
Olympic badminton players of China
Badminton players at the 1998 Asian Games
Badminton players at the 2002 Asian Games
Asian Games medalists in badminton
Asian Games gold medalists for China
Medalists at the 1998 Asian Games
Medalists at the 2002 Asian Games
World No. 1 badminton players